Tareq Abdullah (born 6 September 1995) is a Saudi Arabian professional footballer who plays as a right-back or defensive midfielder for Saudi Pro League side Al-Taawoun.

Club career
Tareq Abdullah began his career at Al-Ittihad and was promoted to the first team during the 2016–17 season. He made his league debut for the club on 7 April 2017, starting in the 1–1 draw against Al-Nassr. On 5 February 2018, Abdullah signed his first professional contract with the club. On 4 October 2018, Abdullah was substituted off the pitch after getting injured in the league match against Al-Fateh. Later, it was announced that he had injured his ACL and would undergo surgery. Abdullah made his return on 24 November 2019 in the 2–1 win against Al-Ettifaq. On 15 October 2020, Abdullah joined Damac on loan. On 4 July 2021, Abdullah joined Al-Taawoun on a free transfer.

Career statistics

Club

Honours
Al-Ittihad
King Cup: 2018
Crown Prince Cup: 2016–17

References

External links
 

1995 births
Living people
Sportspeople from Jeddah
Saudi Arabian footballers
Saudi Arabia youth international footballers
Association football fullbacks
Association football midfielders
Saudi Professional League players
Ittihad FC players
Damac FC players
Al-Taawoun FC players